This was the first edition of the tournament.

Tommy Robredo won the title after defeating Federico Gaio 7–6(12–10), 5–7, 7–6(8–6) in the final.

Seeds
All seeds receive a bye into the second round.

Draw

Finals

Top half

Section 1

Section 2

Bottom half

Section 3

Section 4

References

External links
Main draw
Qualifying draw

2019 ATP Challenger Tour